Apangea is a genus of butterflies in the family Lycaenidae. The genus is monotypic containing the single species Apangea pang (Oberthür, 1886) endemic to Tibet and West China. This species is sometimes placed in Lycaena.

References

External links

Lycaenidae
Lycaenidae genera